The 2002–03 season was the 124th season in Bolton Wanderers F.C.'s existence, and was their second consecutive season in the top-flight. This article covers the period from 1 July 2002 to 30 June 2003.

Season summary
A home victory over Aston Villa and a memorable 1–0 victory over Manchester United at Old Trafford got Bolton off to another promising start to the season, but their subsequent form was memorable for all the wrong reasons as they only won 2 of their next 21 games, causing most pundits to write them off by the start of 2003. A 4–2 win over Birmingham City on 1 February finally kickstarted their campaign and the club only lost two more games (away to Chelsea and Liverpool) during the rest of the season, leaving them in control of their destiny on the final day. They achieved survival with a 2–1 victory over Middlesbrough.

First-team squad

Left club during season

Reserve squad

Results

FA Premier League

Results per matchday

FA Cup

Coca-Cola Cup

Statistics

Appearances
Bolton used a total of 32 players during the season.

Top scorers

References

 

Bol
2002-03